is a song by Japanese singer-songwriter Yumi Matsutoya and is contained in her studio album "Sakuban Oaishimasho". The song was released as her 17th single on June 21, 1981 from Toshiba EMI and sold over 695,000 copies. It was re-released as a CD single on June 28, 1989.

Overview

Matsutoya was given the offer to write the theme song for the movie "Nerawareta Gakuen" and she wrote "Mamotte Agetai". The song was used as various TV dramas's the theme songs and CF songs afterwards.
Grace Slick appearing in the title of the B-side  is Grace Slick of Jefferson Airplane.

Track listing

Vinyl record

Credits and personnel 
 Masaki Matsubara – electric guitars
 Ryuji Seto – acoustic guitars
 Masataka Matsutoya – keyboard instruments
 Kenji Takamizu – bass
 Eiji Shimamura – drums
 Nobu Saito – percussion instruments
 Keiji Urata – programming
 Tomato Strings – string section
 BUZZ – backing vocals

Charts

Cover versions 
 Tomoyo Harada (1983)
 A.S.A.P (1990, Ajinomoto's Pal Sweet CF song)
 Chihiro Onitsuka (2002)
 Kumiko Iwai (2007, in her album "80'S Hit Parade Vol.1")
 Shutoku Mukai & Kazunobu Mineta (2009, the ending theme of the movie "Shonen Meriken Sack")
 ManaKana (2009, in their album "Futari Uta")
 Risa Niigaki & Eri Kamei from Morning Musume (2009, in their album "Chanpuru 1 ~Happy Marriage Song Cover Shū~")
 Sister Kaya (2009, in their album "Heartful Lovers")
 Himawari Kids (2010, in their album "Taisetsuna Tomodachi ni Okuru Uta")
Kyoko Igarashi (CV=Atsumi Tanezaki) (2016,in "THE IDOLM@STER CINDERELLA MASTER Cute Jewelries! 003)

References 

1981 singles
1981 songs
Japanese-language songs
Japanese film songs
Songs written by Yumi Matsutoya